Kızılbağ Pond, also known as Güzelyayla Pond, is an artificial pond in Mersin Province, Turkey.

The visitors follow the road from Mersin to Kızılbağ and then to another road to Değirmendere. The pond is to the north of the road.
The pond was recently constructed on the upper reaches of Deliçay.

References

Toroslar District
Landforms of Mersin Province
Lakes of Turkey
Artificial lakes